There are two claimants to the title of First ascent of Mount Everest.

The 1924 British Mount Everest expedition, consisting of George Mallory and Andrew Irvine, might have reached the summit, but Mallory and Irvine perished on descent.
The 1953 British Mount Everest expedition, consisting of Tenzing Norgay and Edmund Hillary, was the first confirmed successful ascent.